Potts Creek is an unincorporated community in Alleghany County, Virginia. It is also the name of a watercourse in the same area, Potts Creek (watercourse). It is located just north of the Craig County line, 6 miles north of Paint Bank, and 18 miles south of Covington. It is located on Virginia State Route 18.

External links 
GNIS reference

Unincorporated communities in Virginia
Unincorporated communities in Alleghany County, Virginia